is a railway station on the Shinano Railway Line in Nagakura, in the town of Karuizawa, Nagano, Japan, operated by the third-sector railway operating company Shinano Railway.

Lines
Naka-Karuizawa Station is served by the Shinano Railway Line and is 4.0 kilometers from the starting point of the line at Karuizawa Station.

Station layout
The station consists of two opposed side platforms serving two tracks, with an elevated station building. The station is staffed.

Platforms

Adjacent stations

History
It was renamed Naka-Kuruizawa on 10 April 1956.

Passenger statistics
In fiscal 2011, the station was used by an average of 933 passengers daily.

Surrounding area
Kazuizawa Town Hall

See also
 List of railway stations in Japan

References

External links

  

Railway stations in Nagano Prefecture
Railway stations in Japan opened in 1910
Shinano Railway Line
Karuizawa, Nagano